The Top of His Head is a soundtrack by English guitarist, composer and improvisor Fred Frith, of the 1989 Canadian comedy-drama film, The Top of His Head. Frith wrote and composed all the music, with the exception of "This Old Earth", which was written and sung by Jane Siberry, and a cover of "The Way You Look Tonight". The music was recorded at l'Office National du Film, Montreal, Quebec, Canada in August and September 1988, and was released on LP and CD in 1989 by the Belgian independent label, Crammed Discs. The CD release contained two extra tracks, "Driving to the Train" and "The Long Drive".
Siberry's song, "This Old Earth", was nominated for Best Original Song at the 1990 Genie Awards. A rerecorded version, retitled "Something About Trains", also appeared on her 1989 album Bound by the Beauty.

Reception

A reviewer at AllMusic described the album as "A less aggressive work compared to [Frith's] other releases, though not exactly gentle by any means."

Track listing
All tracks composed by Fred Frith except where stated.

LP release

CD release

Personnel
Fred Frith – all other instruments, machines, radios, tapes, programming
Anne Bourne – cello, accordion
Jean Derome – saxophones
Jane Siberry – voice, guitar, accordion
Christie Macfadyen – voice
Ken Myhr – slide guitar ("This Old Earth")
Peter Mettler – additional tapes, influence, advice

References

Albums produced by Fred Frith
Fred Frith soundtracks
1989 soundtrack albums